Georgios Stamoulis (born 9 January 2003) is a Greek professional footballer who plays as a forward for Super League 2 club AEK Athens B.

Personal life
Stamoulis' older brother, Konstantinos, is also a professional footballer.

References

2003 births
Living people
Greek footballers
Super League Greece 2 players
Olympiacos F.C. B players
Fostiras F.C. players
AEK Athens F.C. B players
Association football forwards
Footballers from Patras